Gareth Salisbury (born 11 March 1941) is a Welsh former professional footballer who played as a forward in The Football League.

Club career

Football League career
His career in the Football league saw him play for Wrexham, Norwich City, Luton Town, Colchester United and Chesterfield.

Non-league career
He also went on to represent Kidderminster Harriers, where he scored five goals in ten appearances between 1967 and 1968 and Bangor City in the English non-leagues.

Australia
He later moved to Melbourne in Australia to play in the Victoria State League for Juventus and was voted Player of the Year in 1970 when the team won the grand slam, consisting of the Victorian State League and Australia Cup, the first national football competition.  

In the 1969 season he made 8 league appearances. In the 1970 season he made 21 league appearances, scoring three goals. The following season he made 17 league appearances, scoring two goals.

International career
He was also capped by Wales at youth international level.

References

External links
 
 Gareth Salisbury at Colchester United Archive Database
 Gareth Salisbury at Wrexham AFC Archive

1941 births
Living people
People from Caernarfon
Sportspeople from Gwynedd
Welsh footballers
Association football forwards
Wrexham A.F.C. players
Norwich City F.C. players
Luton Town F.C. players
Colchester United F.C. players
Chesterfield F.C. players
Kidderminster Harriers F.C. players
Bangor City F.C. players
Brunswick Juventus players
Expatriate soccer players in Australia
Wales youth international footballers